Rudná pod Pradědem (until 1947 Vogelzejf) is a municipality in Bruntál District in the Moravian-Silesian Region of the Czech Republic. It has about 400 inhabitants.

Administrative parts
The municipality is made up of villages of Nová Rudná and Stará Rudná.

References

Villages in Bruntál District